Thunder Creek Falls is a waterfall in Mount Aspiring National Park, Westland District, New Zealand.

The waterfall is the outlet of Thunder Creek, draining from a hanging valley created by erosion caused by the former Haast glacier and the Haast River. Over a period of around 14,000 years, the Haast River has formed a canyon, eroding the bedrock down by approximately the 28 m height of the falls.

Viewing platform 
A viewing platform is accessible via a  walk on a sealed track from the carpark on State Highway 6.  The track to the viewing platform passes through silver beech and kāmahi forest.

Vegetation 
The vegetation in this area has silver beech (Nothofagus menziesii) as the main canopy tree, but there are also podocarps including miro (Prumnopitys ferruginea), mataī (Prumnopitys taxifolia), and rimu (Dacrydium cupressinum). Beneath the canopy there is a variety of broadleaf trees including kāmahi (Weinmannia racemosa), māhoe (Melicytus ramiflorus), wineberry (Aristotelia serrata) and patē (Schefflera digitata).  There are many species of fern including the soft tree fern (Dicksonia antarctica) and smaller ferns including crown fern (Lomaria discolor) and hound's tongue fern (Cynoglossum officinale).  There are also multiple species of Coprosma, including C. robusta (karamū), Coprosma ciliata, and Coprosma rotundifolia.

See also
 List of waterfalls in New Zealand

Notes

References

External links

 Thunder Creek Falls at the World of Waterfalls

Waterfalls of New Zealand
Mount Aspiring National Park
Westland District
Landforms of the West Coast, New Zealand